There are over 20,000 Grade II* listed buildings in England. This page is a list of these buildings in the district of Exeter in Devon.

Buildings

|}

See also
Grade I listed buildings in Exeter

Notes

External links

Lists of Grade II* listed buildings in Devon
Exeter